Macrozelima scripta is a species of hoverfly in the family Syrphidae.

Distribution
Myanmar.

References

Eristalinae
Insects described in 1978
Diptera of Asia